Bangolo is a town in western Ivory Coast. It is a sub-prefecture of and the seat of Bangolo Department in Guémon Region, Montagnes District. Bangolo is also a commune.

In 2021, the population of the sub-prefecture of Bangolo was 56,415.

Villages
The 21 villages of the sub-prefecture of Bangolo and their population in 2014 are:

Notes

Sub-prefectures of Guémon
Communes of Guémon